Bill Hughes (1915-1978) was a professional American football player who played offensive lineman for five seasons for the Philadelphia Eagles and Chicago Bears.

References

1915 births
American football offensive linemen
Philadelphia Eagles players
Chicago Bears players
Texas Longhorns football players
1978 deaths
People from Van Alstyne, Texas